The 1996 Franklin Templeton Classic, also known as the Arizona Tennis Championships, was a men's tennis tournament played on outdoor hard courts in Scottsdale, Arizona in the United States and was part of the World Series of the 1996 ATP Tour. It was the ninth edition of the tournament and was held from March 4 through March 10, 1996. First-seeded Wayne Ferreira won the singles title.

Finals

Singles

 Wayne Ferreira defeated  Marcelo Ríos 2–6, 6–3, 6–3
 It was Ferreira's 1st singles title of the year and the 12th of his career.

Doubles

 Patrick Galbraith /  Rick Leach defeated  Richey Reneberg /  Brett Steven 5–7, 7–5, 7–5
 It was Galbraith's 1st title of the year and the 27th of his career. It was Leach's 2nd title of the year and the 35th of his career.

References

External links
 ITF tournament edition details

Franklin Templeton Classic
Tennis Channel Open
 
Franklin Templeton Classic
Franklin Templeton Classic
Franklin Templeton Classic